Golem is an inductive logic programming algorithm developed by Stephen Muggleton and Feng. It uses the technique relative least general generalization proposed by Gordon Plotkin. Therefore, only positive examples are used and the search is bottom-up.
Negative examples can be used to reduce the size of the hypothesis by deleting useless literals from the body clause.

Inductive logic programming